Filer is an unincorporated community in northern Douglas County, in the Ozarks of southern Missouri.

History
A post office called Filer was established in 1895, and remained in operation until 1913. The community  has the name of the Filer family.

References

Unincorporated communities in Douglas County, Missouri
1895 establishments in Missouri
Unincorporated communities in Missouri